Chlum-Korouhvice is a municipality in Žďár nad Sázavou District in the Vysočina Region of the Czech Republic. It has about 40 inhabitants.

Administrative parts
The municipality is made up of villages of Chlum and Korouhvice.

References

Villages in Žďár nad Sázavou District